The Mariners Harbor Houses are a public housing complex built and operated by the New York City Housing Authority and located in the Mariners Harbor neighborhood of Staten Island, New York City. It was completed on August 31, 1954. Consisting of 22 three and six-story buildings it contains 605 apartments housing some 1,728 residents. It is bordered by Lockman Avenue, Roxbury Street, Grandview Avenue, and Continental Place. Brabant Street runs through the complex. It is located within the boundaries of Staten Island's 121st Police Precinct.

The Mariners Harbor Houses are the westernmost public housing development in New York City.

References
https://web.archive.org/web/20110604120935/http://www.nyc.gov/html/nycha/html/developments/statenmariner.shtml

Residential buildings completed in 1954
Residential buildings in Staten Island
Public housing in Staten Island
1954 establishments in New York City
Mariners Harbor, Staten Island